Terrance Odean (born c. 1950) is the Rudd Family Foundation Professor and Chair of the Finance Group at the Haas School of Business, University of California, Berkeley. He is known for his work on behavioral finance.

After dropping out of Carleton College a half-year short of earning a creative writing degree, Odean applied to return to school at UC, Berkeley at the age of 37. Odean considered studying psychology in grad school. However, Nobel economics laureate Daniel Kahneman convinced him to pursue a Ph.D. in finance instead. He lives with his wife in Berkeley, California, and has three daughters.

Notes

External links

21st-century American economists
Living people
Haas School of Business faculty
1968 births
University of California, Berkeley alumni